Abiel Peak is a  mountain summit located in eastern King County of Washington state. It is set 1,000 feet west of the crest of the Cascade Range, on land managed by Mount Baker-Snoqualmie National Forest. Abiel Peak is situated six miles south-southwest of Snoqualmie Pass, and neighbors include Silver Peak, three-quarters mile to the north-northeast, Tinkham Peak three-quarters mile to the east, and Humpback Mountain two miles to the northwest. Precipitation runoff from the south side of the mountain drains into headwaters of Tinkham Creek which is a tributary of the North Fork Cedar River, whereas the north side of the mountain drains into Annette Lake, thence the South Fork Snoqualmie River via Humpback Creek.

Etymology

This geographic landform was named by The Mountaineers and has been officially adopted by the U.S. Board on Geographic Names to honor Lieutenant Abiel W. Tinkham. He worked as a railroad surveyor when he explored the Snoqualmie Pass area in 1853 and 1854. He is also the namesake of nearby Tinkham Peak, and Tinkham Mountain in Glacier National Park, Montana.

Climate

Abiel Peak is located in the marine west coast climate zone of western North America. Most weather fronts originate in the Pacific Ocean, and travel northeast toward the Cascade Mountains. As fronts approach, they are forced upward by the peaks of the Cascade Range, causing them to drop their moisture in the form of rain or snowfall onto the Cascades (Orographic lift). As a result, the west side of the Cascades experiences high precipitation, especially during the winter months in the form of snowfall. Because of maritime influence, snow tends to be wet and heavy, resulting in high avalanche danger. During winter months, weather is usually cloudy, but, due to high pressure systems over the Pacific Ocean that intensify during summer months, there is often little or no cloud cover during the summer. The months July through September offer the most favorable weather for viewing or climbing this peak.

Gallery

See also

 Geology of the Pacific Northwest

References

External links
 Weather forecast: Abiel Peak

Mountains of Washington (state)
Mountains of King County, Washington
Mount Baker-Snoqualmie National Forest
Cascade Range
North American 1000 m summits